Gerolamo Cappello, O.F.M. Conv. (died 1643) was a Roman Catholic prelate who served as Bishop of Termoli (1626–1643).

Biography
Gerolamo Cappello ordained a priest in the Order of Friars Minor Conventual. On 26 November 1626, he was appointed during the papacy of Pope Urban VIII as Bishop of Termoli. On 30 November 1626, he was consecrated bishop by Marcello Lante della Rovere, Cardinal-Priest of Santi Quirico e Giulitta, with Fabrizio Caracciolo Piscizi, Bishop of Catanzaro, and Giovanni Battista Altieri, Bishop of Camerino, serving as co-consecrators. He served as Bishop of Termoli until his death in 1643.

See also 
Catholic Church in Italy

References

External links and additional sources
 (Chronology of Bishops) 
 (Chronology of Bishops) 

17th-century Italian Roman Catholic bishops
Bishops appointed by Pope Urban VIII
1643 deaths
Conventual Franciscan bishops